Etiopía / Plaza de la Transparencia (formerly Etiopía) is a metro station on the Mexico City Metro. It is located in the Benito Juárez borough of Mexico City.

General information
The station logo depicts the head of a lion, a symbol of Ethiopia. Its name comes from the Plaza Etiopía, a traffic circle at the same location before the construction of the subway station. The traffic circle was named to show Mexico's support for an independent Ethiopia after the Italian invasion of Ethiopia. There is a corresponding Mexico Square in the Ethiopian capital city of Addis Ababa.  Mexico Square is also a station on the Addis Ababa Light Rail.

Metro Etiopía / Plaza de la Transparencia is underneath the intersection of Avenida Xola, Avenida Cuauhtemoc, Cumbres de Maltrata street and Diagonal de San Antonio. It serves  Narvarte neighbourhood.

On March 27, 2009, the station name was changed to Etiopía / Plaza de la Transparencia (Ethiopia / Transparency Square), as the Instituto Federal de Acceso a la Información Publica (Federal Institute of Public Information Access) is near the station, and so it would fit the name of the closest Metrobús station.

Ridership

Exits
Northwest: Eje 4 Sur Xola, Colonia Narvarte
Southwest: Anaxágoras, Colonia Narvarte
Southeast: Cumbres de Maltrata, Colonia Narvarte
Northeast: Eje 4 Sur Xola, Colonia Narvarte

Gallery

References

External links
 

 
Mexico City Metro Line 3 stations
Railway stations opened in 1980
1980 establishments in Mexico
Mexico City Metro stations in Benito Juárez, Mexico City
Accessible Mexico City Metro stations